Pickler & Ben is an American syndicated daytime talk show hosted by country singer Kellie Pickler and media personality Ben Aaron, focusing on lifestyle, beauty, celebrity and advertorial segments, along with the subjects of human interest stories. The series premiered on September 18, 2017. The series also had a "shop the show" advertorial segments tying into merchandise featured by cable shopping network HSN and its website. In March 2019, it was announced that Pickler & Ben was canceled after two seasons. The final episode aired on May 22, 2019.

Production
Pickler & Ben launched on September 18, 2017, being exclusive in that season to the stations of the producing television station group E. W. Scripps Company, along with a late night cable replay on CMT for nationwide coverage of the series. The show is recorded in Nashville and hosted by Scripps' CBS affiliate WTVF, and is recorded with a live audience at Skyway Studios, the former north Nashville studio facility of the Christian Broadcasting Network. Multiple episodes are taped throughout a period of days each month, with Ben Aaron flying into Nashville from his New York home.

On January 16, 2018, it was announced that Pickler & Ben was renewed for season 2. The renewal came with much-wider distribution, as Disney–ABC Domestic Television now distributes the series to a wider base of affiliates outside of Scripps, including ABC's large-market base of O&O stations (with CMT not carrying it in subsequent seasons). Season 2 premiered on September 17, 2018.

On March 1, 2019, it was announced that the show would not be picked up for a third season and, thus, ended its run in May 2019, mainly due to potential time slots being blocked out in major markets by ABC O&O stations and NBC Owned Television Stations for new talk shows hosted by Kelly Clarkson and Tamron Hall, including New York, Los Angeles, Chicago, Philadelphia, Dallas-Fort Worth and others; this would have left Pickler & Ben in undesirable late night slots in the future. Aaron remains employed by Scripps; he is now a features reporter for new Scripps New York flagship station WPIX and their morning newscasts.

Repeats of Pickler & Ben aired until February 2020 on the Live Well Network, a digital subchannel network on ABC's owned-and-operated stations, after which it was converted to a new concept, Localish.

References

External links
 
 

2010s American television talk shows
2017 American television series debuts
2019 American television series endings
First-run syndicated television programs in the United States
English-language television shows
Television series by Disney–ABC Domestic Television